Fyodor Fyodorovich Ushakov (– ) was an 18th century Russian naval commander and admiral. He is notable for winning every engagement he participated in as the admiral of the Russian fleet.

Life and naval career 
Ushakov was born in the village of Burnakovo in the Yaroslavl gubernia, to a modest family of the minor nobility. His father, Fyodor Ignatyevich Ushakov, was a retired sergeant of the Preobrazhensky regiment of the Russian Imperial guards. By the time Fyodor Ushakov submitted his statement of background (skaska) to the military, his family had not been officially confirmed in the so-called 'dvoryanstvo', yet they surely belonged to serving gentry.  In the submission Ushakov stated that he neither had a coat-of-arms, nor a royal patent for a landed estate, and had no way to prove nobility. In 1798, Fyodor Ushakov, as a vice-admiral of the Black Sea Navy, submitted a request for official nobility and an arms providing a genealogical record. In 1807 his coat-of-arms was added to the General all-Russian book heraldry. In 1815 Fyodor Ushakov and his family were added to the part 6 (ancient nobility) of the Yaroslavl genealogical book. 

On 15 February 1761, he signed up for the Russian Navy in Saint Petersburg. After training, he served on a galley in the Baltic Fleet. In 1768 he was transferred to the Don Flotilla (Azov Sea Navy) in Taganrog, and served in the Russo-Turkish War (1768–74). He commanded Catherine II's own yacht, and was active in protecting Russian merchant ships in the Mediterranean during the First League of Armed Neutrality.

After the Russian Empire conquered the Crimean Khanate in 1783, Ushakov personally supervised the construction of a naval base in Sevastopol and the building of docks in Kherson. During the Russo-Turkish War (1787–92), he defeated the Ottomans at Fidonisi (1788), Kerch Strait (1790), Tendra (1790), and Cape Kaliakra (1791). In these battles, he demonstrated the ingenuity of his innovative doctrines in the art of naval warfare.

In 1798 Ushakov was promoted to full admiral and given command of a squadron which sailed to the Mediterranean via Constantinople, where it joined with a Ottoman squadron. The combined Russian-Ottoman fleet then operated under Ushakov's command in the War of the Second Coalition against the French Republic. The expedition started by conquering the Ionian islands, acquired by France the year before from the defunct Republic of Venice in the Treaty of Campo Formio. This action culminated in the Siege of Corfu (1798–1799), and led to the subsequent creation of the Septinsular Republic. Ushakov's squadron then blockaded French bases in Italy, notably Genoa and Ancona, and successfully assaulted Naples and Rome.

Tsar Paul, in his capacity as the Grand Master of the Order of St. John, ordered Ushakov to proceed to Malta, which a British fleet under Nelson was assisting in besieging.

However, after rendezvousing with the Coalition forces on Malta, Ushakov was almost immediately recalled back home to Russia in 1800 (along with his fleet), where the new Emperor, Alexander I, failed to appreciate his victories. Ushakov resigned command in 1807 and withdrew into the Sanaksar Monastery in modern-day Mordovia. He was asked to command the local militia during the Patriotic War of 1812 but declined.

In the course of 43 naval battles under his command he did not lose a single ship and never lost a battle.

Tactics 
Distinguishing features of Ushakov's tactics were: use of unified marching and fighting orders; resolute closing to close quarters with the enemy forces without evolution of a fighting order; concentration of effort against enemy flagships; maintaining a reserve (Kaiser-flag squadrons); combination of aimed artillery fire and maneuvering; and chasing the enemy to its total destruction or capture. Giving great value to sea and fire training of his staff, Ushakov was a supporter of generalissimo Suvorov's principles of training for sailors and officers. Ushakov's innovations were among the first successful developments of naval tactics, from its "line" to maneuvering concepts.

Legacy 

Several warships have been named after Admiral Ushakov.

On 3 March 1944 the Presidium of the Supreme Soviet of the USSR established the Order of Ushakov for Navy officers who showed outstanding achievement leading to victory over a numerically superior enemy.  This medal was one of several which was preserved in Russia upon the dissolution of the Soviet Union, thus remaining one of the highest military awards in the Russian Federation. The Ushakov Medal was established simultaneously for servicemen who had risked their life in naval theatres defending the Soviet Union. In May 2014, the medal was presented to 19 surviving British sailors who had served on the Arctic convoys during World War II in a ceremony aboard HMS Belfast.

The Baltic Naval Institute in Kaliningrad also carries his name. The minor planet 3010 Ushakov, discovered by Soviet astronomer Lyudmila Ivanovna Chernykh in 1978, is named after him.

In 1953 two Soviet films were released portraying his career Attack from the Sea and Admiral Ushakov. In both films he was played by Ivan Pereverzev.

Ushakov is one of the eight patrons depicted in the Cathedral of the Resurrection of Christ at Patriot Park, Moscow.

Canonization 
On 7 August 2001 the Russian Orthodox Church  glorified Feodor (Theodore) Ushakov as a Saint and declared as the patron of Russian Navy, His relics are enshrined in Sanaksar Monastery, Temnikov, Russia.

In 2005, in the Cathedral of St. Theodore Ushakov in Saransk (Mordovia), Patriarch Alexius II declared Saint Feodor (Theodore) Ushakov the patron saint of Russian nuclear-armed strategic bombers.

His feast days are: 2 October (day of death), 23 July (glorification) and 23 May (saints of Yaroslavl and Rostov)

References

External links
M. Romm movie (IMDb)
English biography
The Naval Art of Admiral Fyodor F. Ushakov
Ushakov's battleship St Paul
(Святой морской дьявол) (The holy sea-devil), an article in Kommersant-Dengi (in Russian), available online
 Baltic Naval Institute named after F.F. Ushakov 
 Sanaksar Monastery - Official site 
 Sanaksar Monastery - Photo gallery 

1745 births
1817 deaths
People from Rybinsky District, Yaroslavl Oblast
Imperial Russian Navy admirals
Russian commanders of the Napoleonic Wars
Russian religious leaders
Russian saints
Military saints
Crimea in the Russian Empire
19th-century Christian saints
Recipients of the Order of St. George of the Second Degree
Russian military personnel of the French Revolutionary Wars
History of the Ionian Islands
People of the Russo-Turkish War (1768–1774)